
Lac de Conche is a lake in the canton of Valais, Switzerland. It is located in the municipality of Collombey-Muraz, at an elevation of 1687 m, close to the French border.

Girl Guides and Girl Scouts World Camp 
At the 15th World Conference of WAGGGS it was decided to mark the centenary of the birth of Lord Baden-Powell, the founder of Guiding, by holding a World Camp with four locations — Doe Lake, Ontario, Canada; Quezon City, Philippines; Lac de Conche; and Windsor Great Park, England, from January 19 to February 2, 1957.

References

Conche